Las Bandidas (Bandidas) is a 2013 Spanish-language telenovela that was produced by RTI Producciones and Televisa for México-based television network Canal de las Estrellas and Colombia-based television network RCN TV. It is a remake of Las Amazonas, a Venezuelan telenovela produced for Venevisión. Ana Lucía Domínguez and Marco Méndez will star as the protagonists.

Plot 
"Las Bandidas" tells the story of three sisters, who were raised in a different way by their father who is engaged in the business of breeding horses. The three sisters seek to build their path in their lives, in ways that are not exactly what their father envisioned for them.

Cast

Main 

 Ana Lucía Domínguez as Fabiola Montoya, she is the eldest daughter of Olegario Montoya, who has delegated to it the administration of the Treasury "Las Bandidas".
 Marco Méndez as Alonso Cáceres, he is a veterinarian.
 Daniela Bascopé as Corina Montoya, Olegario's second daughter. She is a biologist.
 Marjorie Magri as Amparo Montoya, Olegario's youngest daughter.
 Daniel Lugo as Olegario Montoya, he owns the Hacienda "Las Bandidas". And father of Fabiola, Corina and Amparo.
 Guillermo Dávila as Rodrigo Irazábal, Olegario enemy. Owner of the "Hacienda Irazábal". Prestigious and attractive biologist.
 Jean Paul Leroux as Sergio Navarro, Fabiola boyfriend and trusted man Olegario.
 Claudia La Gatta as Malena Montoya, the second and current wife of Olegario.
 Caridad Canelón as Zenaida Mijares "Yaya", mother of Rubén. Housekeeper Hacienda "Las Bandidas" and confident woman Olegario Montoya.

Recurring 
 Carlos Cruz as Matacán, trusted man Olegario and executor of his orders
 Gabriel Parisi as Reynaldo Castillo, he is Amparo boyfriend Montoya.
 Christian McGaffney as Rubén Mijares, Zenaida son. Pawn of Hacienda "Las Bandidas", where he lives and works.
 Héctor Peña as Vicente Uribe, Corina study partner.
 Sabrina Salvador as Dinorah
 Gioia Arismendi as Marta Moreno
 Crisbel Henriquez as Nelly
 Milena Santander as Fermina
 Nany Tovar as Julia
 Laureano Olivares as Remigio
 María Cristina Lozada as Doña Ricarda Irázabal

Guest 
 Roberto Messutti as Tulio Irazabal
 Sandra Díaz as Betsabe
 Miguel de León as Gaspar Infante

Broadcast 
The series originally aired from April 3, 2013 to September 3, 2013 in Venezuela on Televen.

References

External links 

Venezuelan telenovelas
RTI Producciones telenovelas
Televisa telenovelas
Spanish-language telenovelas
2013 telenovelas
RCTV telenovelas
2013 Venezuelan television series debuts
2013 Venezuelan television series endings
2013 Mexican television series debuts
2013 Mexican television series endings
2013 Colombian television series debuts
2013 Colombian television series endings
Colombian telenovelas
Mexican telenovelas
Mexican television series based on Venezuelan television series
Television shows set in Caracas